Mark Edward Ellis (born 6 January 1962) is a former English professional footballer who played the majority of his league career for his hometown club Bradford City as a left winger.

Career
Mark first came to the attention of Bradford City while playing for the junior club Trinity Athletic in 1978 as an amateur, before he was taken as a non-contract player in 1980. He made his debut as a substitute on 11 April 1980 in a 3–3 draw with Wigan Athletic, before signing as a full-time professional the following month. The following season, he played 18 league games as Bradford won promotion from Division Four under the guidance of Roy McFarland. McFarland soon left and was replaced by Trevor Cherry, who gave Ellis more league games each season. He was a regular by the time City won the Division Three title in 1984–85 starting in all but two league games. On the last day of that successful season, his day was to turn into a nightmare when 56 spectators were killed in the Bradford City stadium fire in a game against Lincoln City. Following his promotion, Ellis, nicknamed "Mega Star", came close to playing in all four divisions when City missed out on promotion to 1987–88 on the final day of the season. But the season also proved to be a personal disaster for Ellis, when his career nearly ended right after his 26th birthday following a cruciate ligament injury in a 1–1 draw at St Andrew's against Birmingham City. Ellis was injured for more than a year and played just 11 more league games for City in two more seasons.

Ellis had been known as a tricky winger who could beat opposition defenders, and was later given a testimonial match against an Everton team featuring his friend and former teammate Stuart McCall.

He moved down the leagues to join Halifax Town and later played in the South African premier league for Hellenic FC in Cape Town. He then came back to England and played a few games for Guiseley, scoring the winning goal against Gretna FC on his debut. Ellis then went back to South Africa and worked in the Ajax Academy coaching the u17 team. After  returning to the UK again, he started working at Thomas Danby College coaching the u19 team and running his own coaching business in the Detroit Area of the United States during the summer. He also combined this with a part-time coaching role at the Huddersfield Town Academy, where he worked for over 6 years. Ellis also had a short spell back at Bradford City coaching the under 16s with former teammate John Hendrie and also had a spell as first team coach at Guiseley FC with his former manager Terry Dolan. 

Ellis founded youth academy RIASA, which is co-owned by David Baldwin.

Honours
Bradford City
Football League Third Division: 1984–85

References

1962 births
Living people
English footballers
Association football midfielders
English Football League players
Bradford City A.F.C. players
Halifax Town A.F.C. players
Guiseley A.F.C. players
Bradford City A.F.C. non-playing staff
Footballers from Bradford
RIASA